is a Japanese manga series written by Katsunori Hara and illustrated by Yukiko Gotō. It has been serialized in Shogakukan's seinen manga magazine Big Comic Superior since December 2020.

Publication
Shogakukan released the first collected volume on September 30, 2021. As of July 29, 2022, two volumes have been released.

Volume list

See also
Ushiharu, another manga series by Yukiko Gotō

References

External links
 

Horror anime and manga
Seinen manga
Shogakukan manga